Heinz Seidel (born 5 July 1931) is a German cross-country skier. He competed in the men's 30 kilometre event at the 1964 Winter Olympics. He won the 1962 national East Germany 30 km title.

References

External links
 

1931 births
Living people
East German male cross-country skiers
Olympic cross-country skiers of the United Team of Germany
Cross-country skiers at the 1964 Winter Olympics
People from Klingenthal
Sportspeople from Saxony